Wanda is an unincorporated community in Newton County, Missouri, United States.  It lies along Missouri State Route O, between the towns of Stark City and Stella.

The community is part of the Joplin, Missouri Metropolitan Statistical Area.

A post office Wanda was established in 1886, and remained in operation until 1908. The identity of namesake Wanda is unknown. Other names include Wando and Old Harmony.

References

Unincorporated communities in Newton County, Missouri
Joplin, Missouri, metropolitan area
Unincorporated communities in Missouri